

	

 Bay of Shoals is a locality in the Australian state of South Australia located on the north coast of Kangaroo Island overlooking the Bay of Shoals about  south-west of the state capital of  Adelaide and about  north of the municipal seat of Kingscote.

Its boundaries were created in March 2002 for the "long established name" which was derived from the adjoining bay. The locality occupies land on the western shore line of the Bay of Shoals.

The principal land use is agriculture while a strip of land along the coastline is zoned for conservation in order to "enhance and conserve the natural features of the coast."

Bay of Shoals is located within the federal division of Mayo, the state electoral district of Mawson and the local government area of the Kangaroo Island Council.

References
Notes

Citations

Towns on Kangaroo Island